The Grand Duchy of Mecklenburg-Schwerin and the United States mutually recognized each other in 1816, but formal relations were never established. Relations continued when the Duchy joined the German Empire in 1871. Relations would eventually end with World War I when the U.S. declared war on Germany.

History
The first known act of mutual recognition between the United States and Mecklenburg-Schwerin was in 1816 when John M. Forbes established the first U.S. Consul in the Grand Duchy of Mecklenburg-Schwerin. Forbes was appointed to the post on January 22, 1816.

On December 9, 1847, the Grand Duchy of Mecklenburg-Schwerin signed the Declaration of Accession to the Stipulations and Provisions of the Treaty with Hanover on June 10, 1846. The agreement was signed in Schwerin by the Mecklenburg-Schwerin Minister, L. de Liitzow, and U.S. Special Agent Ambrose Dudley Mann.

On November 26, 1853, the Grand Duchy of Mecklenburg-Schwerin signed the Declaration of Accession to the Convention for the Extradition of Criminals, Fugitive from Justice, of June 16, 1852, between the United States and Prussia and Other States of the German Confederation to provide for the "reciprocal extradition of fugitive criminals, in special cases."

In 1871, the entirety of the Grand Duchy joined German Empire and continued relations from Berlin under a single government. But relations ended with the outbreak of the First World War and the American declaration of war against Germany.

See also

 Foreign relations of the United States
 Germany–United States relations
 Grand Duchy of Baden–United States relations
 Kingdom of Bavaria–United States relations
 Duchy of Brunswick-Lüneburg–United States relations
 Kingdom of Hanover–United States relations
 German Empire–United States relations
 Hanseatic Republics–United States relations
 Grand Duchy of Hesse–United States relations
 Grand Duchy of Mecklenburg-Strelitz–United States relations
 Duchy of Nassau–United States relations
 North German Confederation–United States relations
 Grand Duchy of Oldenburg–United States relations
 Principality of Schaumburg-Lippe–United States relations
 Kingdom of Württemberg–United States relations

References

United States
Bilateral relations of the United States
Germany–United States relations